Ray Chatham (20 July 1924 – 1999) was an English footballer who played in the Football League for Notts County and Wolverhampton Wanderers.

External links
 

English footballers
English Football League players
1924 births
1999 deaths
Wolverhampton Wanderers F.C. players
Notts County F.C. players
Margate F.C. players
Association football defenders